The UNIVAC High speed printer read metal UNIVAC magnetic tape using a UNISERVO tape drive and printed the data at 600 lines per minute. Each line could contain 130 characters in its fixed-width font.

External links
UNIVAC II (PDF) Has photo of High speed printer

UNIVAC hardware